Catherine Malabou (born 1959) is a French philosopher. She is a Professor in the Philosophy Department at the Centre for Research in Modern European Philosophy (CRMEP) at Kingston University, at the European Graduate School, and in the department of Comparative Literature at the University of California Irvine, a position formerly held by Jacques Derrida.

Education 
Malabou graduated from the École Normale Supérieure Lettres et Sciences Humaines (Fontenay-Saint-Cloud). Her agrégation and doctorate were obtained, under the supervision of Jacques Derrida, from the École des hautes études en sciences sociales. Her dissertation became the book L'Avenir de Hegel: Plasticité, Temporalité, Dialectique (1996).

Work 
Central to Malabou's philosophy is the concept of "plasticity," which she derives in part from the work of Georg Wilhelm Friedrich Hegel, but also from medical science, for example, from work on stem cells and from the concept of neuroplasticity. In 1999, Malabou published Voyager avec Jacques Derrida – La Contre-allée, co-authored with Derrida. Her book, Les nouveaux blessés (2007), concerns the intersection between neuroscience, psychoanalysis, and philosophy, thought through the phenomenon of trauma.

Coinciding with her exploration of neuroscience has been an increasing commitment to political philosophy. This is first evident in her book What Should We Do With Our Brain? and continues in Les nouveaux blessés, as well as in her book on feminism (Changer de différence, le féminin et la question philosophique, Galilée, 2009), and in her forthcoming book about the homeless and social emergency (La grande exclusion, Bayard).

Malabou is co-writing a book with Adrian Johnston on affects in Descartes, Spinoza and neuroscience, and is preparing a new book on the political meaning of life in the light of the most recent biological discoveries (mainly epigenetics). The latter work will discuss Giorgio Agamben's concept of "bare life" and Michel Foucault's notion of biopower, underscoring the lack of scientific biological definitions of these terms, and the political meaning of such a lack.

In May 2022, Edinburgh University Press published the first authorized collection of Malabou's shorter writings, entitled Plasticity: The Promise of Explosion (ed. Tyler M. Williams with an introduction by Ian James).

Bibliography

Books 
 Plasticity: The Promise of Explosion (Edinburgh: Edinburgh University Press, 2022, ed. Tyler M. Williams).
 Au voleur! Anarchisme et philosophie (Paris: P.U.F., 2022)
 Le plaisir effacé: Clitoris et pensée (Paris: Rivages, 2020)
 (English translation) Pleasure Erased: The Clitoris Unthought (Cambridge: Polity, 2022, trans. Carolyn Shread)
 Avant demain. Épigenèse et rationalité (Paris: P.U.F., 2014)
 (English translation) Before Tomorrow: Epigenesis and Rationality (Cambridge: Polity Press, 2016, trans. Carolyn Shread) .
Self and Emotional Life: Merging Philosophy, Psychoanalysis, and Neuroscience (with Adrian Johnston; New York: Columbia University Press, 2013).
Sois mon corps, with Judith Butler (Paris: Bayard, 2010).
(English translation) You Be My Body For Me, For, Corporeity, Plasticity in Hegel's Phenomenology of Spirit (London: Blackwell, forthcoming).
La Grande Exclusion, l'urgence sociale, thérapie et symptômes (Paris: Bayard: 2009).
Changer de différence, le féminin et la question philosophique, (Paris: Galilée 2009).
(English translation) Changing Difference, (Cambridge: Polity Press, 2011, trans. Carolyn Shread).
La Chambre du milieu, de Hegel aux neurosciences, collected, (Paris: Hermann 2009).
Ontologie de l'accident: Essai sur la plasticité destructrice (Paris: Éditions Léo Scheer, 2009).
(English translation) The Ontology of the Accident: An Essay on Destructive Plasticity (Cambridge: Polity Press, forthcoming).
Les Nouveaux Blessés: de Freud a la neurologie: penser les traumatismes contemporains (Paris: Bayard, 2007).
(English translation) The New Wounded: From Neurosis to Brain Damage (New York: Fordham University Press, 2012).
La Plasticité au soir de l'écriture (Paris: Éditions Léo Scheer, 2004).
(English translation) Plasticity at the Dusk of Writing: Dialectic, Destruction, Deconstruction (New York: Columbia University Press, 2009, trans. Carolyn Shread).
Que faire de notre cerveau? (Paris: Bayard, 2004).
(English translation) What Should We Do With Our Brain? (New York: Fordham University Press, 2009, trans. Sebastian Rand).
Le Change Heidegger, du fantastique en philosophie (Paris: Éditions Léo Scheer, 2004). 
(English translation) The Heidegger Change: On the Fantastic in Philosophy (New York: SUNY Press, 2012).
Plasticité (Paris: Éditions Léo Scheer, 1999).
Voyager avec Jacques Derrida – La Contre-allée, with Jacques Derrida (Paris: La Quinzaine littéraire-Louis Vuitton, 1999).
(English translation) Counterpath: Traveling with Jacques Derrida (Stanford: Stanford University Press, 2004, trans. David Wills).
L'Avenir de Hegel: Plasticité, Temporalité, Dialectique (Paris: Vrin, 1996).
(English translation) The Future of Hegel: Plasticity, Temporality, and Dialectic (New York: Routledge, 2004, trans. Lisabeth During).

Articles (selection)
 "The Brain of History, or, The Mentality of the Anthropocene," South Atlantic Quarterly 116:1 (2017): 39–53.
"Post-Trauma: Towards a New Definition?", in Tom Cohen (ed.), Telemorphosis: Theory in the Era of Climate Change, Volume 1 (Ann Arbor: Open Humanities Press, 2012), pp. 226–38.
"Plasticity and Elasticity in Freud's 'Beyond the Pleasure Principle'," parallax 15:2 (2009): 41–52.
"A Conversation with Catherine Malabou", Journal for Cultural and Religious Theory 9 (2008): 1–13.
"The End of Writing? Grammatology and Plasticity," The European Legacy: Toward New Paradigms 12 (2007): 431–441.
"An Eye at the Edge of Discourse," Communication Theory 17 (2007): 16–25.
"Another Possibility," Research in Phenomenology 36 (2006): 115–129.
"The Form of an 'I'," in John D. Caputo & Michael J. Scanlon (eds.), Augustine and Postmodernism: Confessions and Circumfession (Bloomington: Indiana University Press, 2005): 127–137.
"History and the Process of Mourning in Hegel and Freud," Radical Philosophy 106 (2001): 15–20.
"Plastic Readings of Hegel," Bulletin of the Hegel Society of Great Britain 41-42 (2000): 132–141.
"The Future of Hegel: Plasticity, Temporality, Dialectic," Hypatia: A Journal of Feminist Philosophy 15 (2000): 196–220.
"Who's Afraid of Hegelian Wolves?," in Paul Patton (ed.), Deleuze: A Critical Reader (Oxford: Blackwell, 1996): 114–138.

Secondary literature
Ian James, The Technique of Thought: Nancy, Laruelle, Malabou and Stiegler After Naturalism, Minneapolis: University of Minnesota Press, 2019.
Ian James, "État présent: Post-deconstructive Thought and Criticism", French Studies, 73:1 (2018), 84-102.
 Ian James, "(Neuro)Plasticity, Epigenesis and the Void", Parrhesia 25 (2016), 1-19.
Peter Szendy, ″L'économie de la plasticité″, in Po&sie, No. 155, 2016, 136–145.
Gabriel Schenker, Organic Texture: A Dialogue between Deleuze and Guattari, the Life Sciences, and Catherine Malabou, New York : Atropos Press, 2014.
Tyler Williams, "Plasticity, in Retrospect: Changing the Future of the Humanities." Diacritics vol. 41, 1, September 2013, 6-25.
 Ian James, The New French Philosophy, Cambridge, Polity, 2012.
Ruth Leys, Review of "What Should we Do with Our Brains," nonsite.org 2 (Spring 2011)
Justin Clemens, The Age of Plastic; or, Catherine Malabou on the Hegelian Futures Market, Cosmos and History: The Journal of Natural and Social Philosophy, Vol 6, No 1, 2010, 153–162.
Frédéric Worms, Ce qui est atteint dans le cerveau (Catherine Malabou, Les nouveaux Blessés), Esprit, Paris, February 2009, 204–208.
Slavoj Žižek, Quando una vittima sopravvive alla propria morte (on Catherine Malabou Les nouveaux Blessés), Il Manifesto, Roma, January 2008, 12.
Descartes and the Post-Traumatic Subject, on Catherine Malabou's Les nouveaux Blessés and Other Autistic Monsters, Qui parle, Berkeley, vol. 17, 2, Spring/Summer 2009, 123–147.
Jean-Paul Martinon, On Futurity, Malabou, Nancy and Derrida, New York : Palgrave and Macmillan, 2007.
Elie During, Politiques du cerveau, (on Catherine Malabou Que faire de notre cerveau ?), Art Press, 302, June 2004, 12–20.
Servanne Jolivet, Heidegger d'un change à l'autre : Catherine Malabou, Didier Franck, François Raffoul, Revue philosophique de la France et de l'étranger, Paris : PUF, 4, October/December 2004, 455–468.
Jean-Philippe Milet, Heidegger en anamorphose , (on Catherine Malabou, Le Change Heidegger. Du fantastique en philosophie), Critique, Paris : Editions de Minuit, 2004, 691, 93-107.
Karin de Boer, Thinking in the Light of Time. Heidegger's Encounter with Hegel, Catherine Malabou, The Future of Hegel, Hegel Studien, Bochum, 2004, Volume 49/50, 80–94.
Kislev, S.F. "A Self-Forming Vessel: Aristotle, Plasticity, and the Developing Nature of the Intellect", Journal of the British Society for Phenomenology, 53:1, 2020, 259-274
Mark Alizart, Plasticiens, arts plastiques, plasticité, Critique, Paris : Editions de Minuit, 649–650, June–July 2001, 540–550.
Lisabeth During, Catherine Malabou and the Currency of Hegelianism, Hypatia, Fall 2000, Vol. 15, No. 4, 190–195.
Önay Sözer, Zukunft aus dem Geist der Plaztizität, Hegel Studien, Bochum, 1997, Volume 70, 28–42.
Benjamin Dalton, What Should We Do with Plasticity? An Interview with Catherine Malabou, Paragraph, Jun 2019, vo. 42, No. 2 : pp. 238–254

References

External links 
Catherine Malabou, Kingston University, London
Catherine Malabou, Paris West University Nanterre La Défense
Catherine Malabou, University of Buffalo, New York
Author Page, Villanova University, Philadelphia
Interviews
Philosophy: Pushing the Limits. An interview with Catherine Malabou listen or download Malabou interviewed by JK Fowler on March 30, 2010

1959 births
Living people
Continental philosophers
Academics of Kingston University
French women philosophers
Feminist philosophers
Feminist psychologists
Feminist studies scholars
French feminists
20th-century French philosophers
University of Paris alumni
Postmodern feminists
French psychoanalysts
Philosophers of technology
Political philosophers
21st-century French philosophers
20th-century French women
21st-century French women